The 2010 Tajik Cup was the 19th edition of the Tajik Cup.

Quarterfinals

|}

Semifinals

|}

Final

References

External links
Tajikistan Football Federation
RSSSF 2010

Tajikistan Cup
Tajikistan
Tajik Cup